German submarine U-223 was a Type VIIC U-boat of Nazi Germany's Kriegsmarine during World War II.

Ordered on 15 August 1940 from the Germaniawerft shipyard in Kiel, she was laid down on 15 July 1941 as yard number 653, launched on 16 April 1942 and commissioned on 6 June under the command of Kapitänleutnant Karl-Jürg Wächter.

A member of eight wolfpacks, she sank two ships totalling  in six patrols.

She was sunk on 30 March 1944 by British warships in the Mediterranean Sea. 23 men died; there were 27 survivors.

Design
German Type VIIC submarines were preceded by the shorter Type VIIB submarines. U-223 had a displacement of  when at the surface and  while submerged. She had two shafts and two  propellers.

U-223 was fitted with five  torpedo tubes (four fitted at the bow and one at the stern), fourteen torpedoes, one  SK C/35 naval gun, 220 rounds, and a  C/30 anti-aircraft gun. The boat had a complement of between forty-four and sixty.

Service history

First patrol
For her first patrol, U-223 departed Kiel on 12 January 1943. Keeping to the Norwegian side of the North Sea, she entered the Atlantic Ocean having negotiated the gap between Iceland and the Faroe Islands. She moved to the south of Greenland. There, she sank the troop transport SS Dorchester west of Cape Farewell on 3 February. The troop ship was sailing with a total of 904 people on board. 675 of them died. Four of the dead were chaplains of different faiths who had given up their lifebelts to soldiers among the incumbents. The clergymen were posthumously awarded the Distinguished Service Cross and the Purple Heart; the US Congress declared 3 February 'Chaplains Observance Day' in 1961.

She also sank Winkler on 23 February; the ship went down in 45 seconds. The U-boat then prevented any retaliation from the convoy escort ships by diving underneath survivors in the water.

U-223 was attacked by a British Flying Fortress of No. 59 Squadron RAF on 1 March. The aircraft dropped seven depth charges which overshot. Damage to the U-boat was slight, but the Fortress was hit and only just managed to return to its base.

The submarine docked at St. Nazaire in occupied France on 6 March.

Second patrol
U-223 was depth charged to the surface and shelled by the destroyer  in mid-Atlantic on 11 May 1943. Meanwhile, U-223 had escaped the wrath of the British ship and returned to St. Nazaire. Due to the repairs needed, she did not put to sea again until September.

Third patrol
Having left St. Nazaire on 14 September, the boat had passed the heavily fortified British base at Gibraltar by the 26th. Before docking at Toulon on 16 October, she attacked Stanmore on the second near Cape Ivi, Algeria. The badly damaged ship was taken under tow by two tugs. She was beached at Cape Tenes where she broke in two and was declared a total loss.

Fourth and fifth patrols
Also a total loss was the British frigate HMS Cuckmere (K299). She had been escorting a convoy off Bougie when she was hit. She was towed to Algiers and returned to the US Navy in 1946.

U-223s fifth sortie was relatively uneventful, passing south of Sardinia and headed for the Italian mainland.

Sixth patrol and loss
The U-boat had left Toulon on 16 March 1944. By early morning of the 30th, the U-boat, after heavy depth charging, was forced to the surface, where she was engaged by gunfire. Before being sunk, U-223 managed to sink HMS Laforey.

23 men died; there were 27 survivors.

Wolfpacks
U-223 took part in eight wolfpacks, namely:
 Haudegen (26 January – 2 February 1943) 
 Nordsturm (2 – 9 February 1943) 
 Haudegen (9 – 15 February 1943) 
 Taifun (15 – 20 February 1943) 
 Amsel (22 April – 3 May 1943) 
 Amsel 2 (3 – 6 May 1943) 
 Elbe (7 – 10 May 1943) 
 Elbe 2 (10 – 12 May 1943)

Summary of raiding history

References

Notes

Citations

Bibliography

External links

German Type VIIC submarines
World War II submarines of Germany
U-boats commissioned in 1942
U-boats sunk in 1944
U-boats sunk by British warships
U-boats sunk by depth charges
1942 ships
World War II shipwrecks in the Mediterranean Sea
Ships built in Kiel
Maritime incidents in March 1944